T. maritimum may refer to:
 Triglochin maritimum, an arrowgrass species found in brackish marshes, freshwater marshes, wet sandy beaches, fens and damp grassland
 Tripleurospermum maritimum, the sea mayweed, a plant species

See also
 Maritimum (disambiguation)